WIWU-LP (94.3 FM) is a radio station licensed to Marion, Indiana, United States.  The station is currently owned by Indiana Wesleyan University.

History
The station went on the air as WCWC-LP on 2001-06-26.  on 2007-07-17, the station changed its call sign to the current WIWU.

The station is completely operated and managed by students at Indiana Wesleyan University.  Any student at IWU is allowed and encouraged to gain the experience of having a weekly radio show.

WIWU features several specialty shows including Studio 214, a community-focused talk show; Fortress Throwbacks, a Classic Contemporary Christian/Hard Rock show; and Soul Food, a Black Gospel show.

References

External links 
 

IWU-LP
IWU-LP
Indiana Wesleyan University
IWU-LP
IWU-LP